Beggs (Irish: Ó Beig) is a Gaelic surname, which originated in Scotland. It is derived from the Gaelic word beag, which means little. As a result of migration Beggs live in Ireland, Scotland, England, United States, Canada, Australia, and New Zealand. It was first found in Inverness-shire, where they held a family seat from ancient times. Spelling variants include Begg, Begge or Beg

People
Barbara Cass-Beggs (1904–1990), Canadian folk song collector, singer and teacher
Bobby Beggs, Irish gaelic footballer
Charles A. Beggs (1869-1939), American politician
Jacqueline Beggs (born 1962), New Zealand entomologist and ecologist
James M. Beggs (1926-2020), former American NASA administrator
Joe Beggs (1910-1983), American baseball player
John I. Beggs (1847–1925), American entrepreneur, former director of General Electric
Lyall T. Beggs (1899–1973), American politician
Nick Beggs (born 1961), British musician, member of Kajagoogoo
Pam Beggs (born 1947), Australian politician
Roy Beggs (born 1936), Northern Ireland politician
Roy Beggs Jr. (born 1962), Northern Ireland politician, son of Roy Beggs

See also
Beggs
Begg

References